Royal S. Copeland (1868–1938) was a U.S. Senator from New York from 1923 until 1938. 

Senator Copeland may also refer to:

Charles L. Copeland (born 1963), Delaware State Senate
Joseph T. Copeland (1813–1893), Michigan State Senate